Zuqaqip of Kish was the ninth Sumerian king of the semi-legendary First Dynasty of Kish, according to the Sumerian King List, where his length of reign is given as 900 years. His name means "Scorpion". Zuqaqip is unlikely to have existed as his name does not appear on texts dating from the period in which he was presumed to have lived (Early Dynastic period).

Sources

|-

Kings of Kish
Sumerian kings